The G12 Vision is a Christian evangelism and discipleship strategy established by Pastor César Castellanos, the founder of International Charismatic Mission Church. G12 has been adopted worldwide by different churches.

History

The G12 Vision was formulated in 1991 by Pastor César Castellanos, after attending the Yoido Full Gospel Church in 1983. Seeing that their cell group model fosters church growth, he revamped David Yonggi Cho's South Korean church growth strategy. It grew into another church growth enterprise that churches around the world came to study in their own attempts to foster growth, including mainline Pentecostal denominations like the Assemblies of God and the Church of God (Cleveland). Over the past several years, the application of the G12 model as zealously advanced by Castellanos' organization has become a source of division, contention .

The G12 model has been prominently adopted by different churches in Canada, Hong Kong, the Philippines, Singapore, South Korea and the United States.

G12 International Conference

An annual G12 International Conference is held in Bogotá, Colombia in January and is hosted by Misión Carismática Internacional church. The President of Colombia has frequently attended these events. Former President of Colombia (2002–2010) Álvaro Uribe attended in 2004, 2008, and 2009. In 2006, Senator Germán Vargas Lleras attended and in 2010, former Minister of Defence and future President, Juan Manuel Santos spoke at the conference.

References

External links

Official sites

 G12 Beliefs, Official Site
 G12 Vision, Official Site
 Official G12 Europe Site
 MCI Canada - Official French speaking website
 MCI Aragua - Venezuela
 G12 Venezuela - Official G12 Site in Venezuela, with church addresses, news and preachings (spanish only)
 Södermalmskyrkan - Södermalmskyrkans officiella hemsida, Sodermalmschurch's official website (Swedish only)

Protestantism in Colombia
Evangelicalism in South America